The 2022 HearingLife Tour Challenge was held from October 18 to 23 at the Coca-Cola Centre in Grande Prairie, Alberta. It was the second Grand Slam event of the 2022–23 curling season.

During the draw to the button before the semifinal games, Niklas Edin sustained a knee injury that forced him out of the event. His remaining three team members, Oskar Eriksson, Rasmus Wranå, and Christoffer Sundgren went on to win the semifinal game against Brad Gushue and then beat Matt Dunstone in the championship game.

Qualification
The Tour Challenge consists of two tiers of 16 teams. For Tier 1, the top 16 ranked men's and women's teams on the World Curling Federation's world team rankings as of September 12, 2022 qualified. In the event that a team declines their invitation, the next-ranked team on the world team ranking is invited until the field is complete. For Tier 2, the next 11 teams on the WCF rankings as of September 15, 2022 were invited. The final 5 teams in Tier 2 are filled by regional invitations extended by the Grand Slam of Curling.

Men

Tier 1
Top world team ranking men's teams:
 Brad Gushue
 Niklas Edin
 Bruce Mouat
 Brendan Bottcher
 Joël Retornaz
 Matt Dunstone
 Reid Carruthers
 Ross Whyte
 Yannick Schwaller
 Kevin Koe
 Colton Flasch
 Marco Hösli
 Michael Brunner
 Glenn Howard
 Steffen Walstad
 John Epping
 Tanner Horgan

Tier 2
World Team Rankings teams:
 Mike McEwen
 Korey Dropkin
 Wouter Gösgens
 Karsten Sturmay
 John Shuster
 Magnus Ramsfjell
 Kody Hartung
 Yves Stocker
 Lukas Høstmælingen
 Aaron Sluchinski
 Kim Chang-min
 Félix Asselin
 Ryan Wiebe

Regional teams:
 Kyler Kleibrink
 Jacques Gauthier
 Ryan Jacques
 Johnson Tao
 Scott Webb

Women

Tier 1
Top world team ranking women's teams:
 Anna Hasselborg
 Kerri Einarson
 Satsuki Fujisawa
 Kaitlyn Lawes
 Tracy Fleury
 Silvana Tirinzoni
 Kim Eun-jung
 Jennifer Jones
 Gim Eun-ji
 Chelsea Carey
 Isabella Wranå
 Daniela Jentsch
 Tabitha Peterson
 Casey Scheidegger
 Hollie Duncan
 Raphaela Keiser

Tier 2
World Team Rankings teams:
 Krista McCarville
 Kerry Galusha
 Kelsey Rocque
 Selena Sturmay
 Clancy Grandy
 Christina Black
 Penny Barker
 Madeleine Dupont
 Andrea Kelly
 Kristy Watling
 Nancy Martin
 Beth Farmer

Regional teams:
 Jessie Hunkin
 Serena Gray-Withers
 Kayla Skrlik
 Elysa Crough
 Kristie Moore

Men

Tier 1

Teams
The teams are listed as follows:

Round-robin standings
Final round-robin standings

Round-robin results
All draw times are listed in Mountain Time (UTC−06:00).

Draw 1
Tuesday, October 18, 8:00 am

Draw 3
Tuesday, October 18, 3:00 pm

Draw 6
Wednesday, October 19, 12:00 pm

Draw 8
Wednesday, October 19, 8:00 pm

Draw 10
Thursday, October 20, 12:00 pm

Draw 12
Thursday, October 20, 8:00 pm

Draw 13
Friday, October 21, 8:30 am

Draw 15
Friday, October 21, 4:00 pm

Tiebreaker
Saturday, October 22, 8:00 am

Playoffs

Quarterfinals
Saturday, October 22, 12:00 pm

Semifinals
Saturday, October 22, 8:00 pm

Final
Sunday, October 23, 10:00 am

Tier 2

Teams
The teams are listed as follows:

Round-robin standings
Final round-robin standings

Round-robin results
All draw times are listed in Mountain Time (UTC−06:00).

Draw 1
Tuesday, October 18, 8:00 am

Draw 3
Tuesday, October 18, 3:00 pm

Draw 6
Wednesday, October 19, 12:00 pm

Draw 8
Wednesday, October 19, 8:00 pm

Draw 10
Thursday, October 20, 12:00 pm

Draw 12
Thursday, October 20, 8:00 pm

Draw 13
Friday, October 21, 8:30 am

Draw 15
Friday, October 21, 4:00 pm

Tiebreakers
Saturday, October 22, 8:00 am

Playoffs

Quarterfinals
Saturday, October 22, 12:00 pm

Semifinals
Saturday, October 22, 8:00 pm

Final
Sunday, October 23, 10:00 am

Women

Tier 1

Teams
The teams are listed as follows:

Round-robin standings
Final round-robin standings

Round-robin results
All draw times are listed in Mountain Time (UTC−06:00).

Draw 2
Tuesday, October 18, 11:30 am

Draw 4
Tuesday, October 18, 6:30 pm

Draw 5
Wednesday, October 19, 8:30 am

Draw 7
Wednesday, October 19, 4:00 pm

Draw 9
Thursday, October 20, 8:30 am

Draw 11
Thursday, October 20, 4:00 pm

Draw 14
Friday, October 21, 12:00 pm

Draw 16
Friday, October 21, 8:00 pm

Tiebreakers
Saturday, October 22, 8:00 am

Playoffs

Quarterfinals
Saturday, October 22, 4:00 pm

Semifinals
Saturday, October 22, 8:00 pm

Final
Sunday, October 23, 2:00 pm

Tier 2

Teams
The teams are listed as follows:
{| class=wikitable
|-
! scope="col"| Skip
! scope="col"| Third
! scope="col"| Second
! scope="col"| Lead
! scope="col"| Alternate
! scope="col"| Locale
|-
| Christina Black || Jenn Baxter || Karlee Jones || Shelley Barker || ||  Halifax, Nova Scotia
|-
| Elysa Crough || Quinn Prodaniuk || Kim Bonneau || Julianna Mackenzie || ||  Edmonton, Alberta
|-
| Madeleine Dupont || Mathilde Halse || Denise Dupont || My Larsen || Jasmin Lander ||  Hvidovre, Denmark
|-
| Beth Farmer || Hailey Duff || Kirstin Bousie || Amy MacDonald || ||  Stirling, Scotland
|-
| Jo-Ann Rizzo (Fourth) || Sarah Koltun || Margot Flemming || Kerry Galusha (Skip) || ||  Yellowknife, Northwest Territories
|-
| Clancy Grandy || Kayla MacMillan || Lindsay Dubue || Sarah Loken || ||  Vancouver, British Columbia
|-
| Serena Gray-Withers || Catherine Clifford || Brianna Cullen || Zoe Cinnamon || ||  Edmonton, Alberta
|-
| Jessie Hunkin || Kristen Streifel || Becca Hebert || Dayna Demers || ||  Spruce Grove, Alberta
|-
| Andrea Kelly || Sylvie Quillian || Jill Brothers || Katie Forward || ||  Fredericton, New Brunswick
|-
| Nancy Martin || Lindsay Bertsch || Jennifer Armstrong || Krysten Karwacki || ||  Saskatoon, Saskatchewan
|-
| Krista McCarville || Kendra Lilly || Ashley Sippala || Sarah Potts || ||  Thunder Bay, Ontario
|-
| Kristie Moore || Susan O'Connor || Janais DeJong || Valerie Ekelund || ||  Sexsmith, Alberta
|-
| Kelsey Rocque || Danielle Schmiemann || Dana Ferguson || Rachelle Brown || ||  Edmonton, Alberta
|-
| Kayla Skrlik || Geri-Lynn Ramsay || Brittany Tran || Ashton Skrlik || ||  Calgary, Alberta
|-
| Selena Sturmay || Abby Marks || Kate Goodhelpsen || Paige Papley || ||  Edmonton, Alberta
|-
| Kristy Watling || Hailey McFarlane || Emilie Rafsnon || Sarah Pyke || ||  Winnipeg, Manitoba
|}

Round-robin standingsFinal round-robin standingsRound-robin results
All draw times are listed in Mountain Time (UTC−06:00).

Draw 2Tuesday, October 18, 11:30 amDraw 4Tuesday, October 18, 6:30 pmDraw 5Wednesday, October 19, 8:30 amDraw 7Wednesday, October 19, 4:00 pmDraw 9Thursday, October 20, 8:30 amDraw 11Thursday, October 20, 4:00 pmDraw 14Friday, October 21, 12:00 pmDraw 16Friday, October 21, 8:00 pmTiebreakersSaturday, October 22, 8:00 amPlayoffs

QuarterfinalsSaturday, October 22, 4:00 pmSemifinalsSaturday, October 22, 8:00 pmFinalSunday, October 23, 2:00 pm''

Notes

References

External links

October 2022 sports events in Canada
2022 in Canadian curling
Curling in Alberta
2022 in Alberta
2022
Sport in Grande Prairie